The Southern School District is a public school district in Gage County, Nebraska, United States, based in Wymore.

Schools
The Southern School District has one elementary school and one high school.

Elementary schools
 Southern Elementary School

High schools
 Southern High School

References

External links

School districts in Nebraska
Education in Gage County, Nebraska